Arrowwood may refer to:

Plants
Cornus florida, in the family Cornaceae
Genus Viburnum in the family Adoxaceae, especially:
Viburnum carlesii
Viburnum dentatum

Other
Arrowwood, Alberta, a village in Canada
Arrowwood National Wildlife Refuge, including Arrowwood Lake, North Dakota, United States
Arrowood station, Charlotte, North Carolina, United States